Taxis to Hell – and Back – Into the Jaws of Death is a photograph taken on June 6, 1944, by Robert F. Sargent, a chief photographer's mate in the United States Coast Guard. It depicts soldiers of the U.S. Army's 1st Infantry Division disembarking from an LCVP (Landing Craft, Vehicle, Personnel) from the U.S. Coast Guard-crewed  at Omaha Beach during the Normandy Landings in World War II.

The photograph
The photograph was taken by Chief Photographer's Mate Robert Sargent during the troop landing phase of Operation Neptune, the naval component of the Operation Overlord Normandy landing commonly known as D-Day.

The photograph was taken at 7:40 AM local time. It depicts the soldiers departing the Higgins boat and wading through waist-deep water towards the "Easy Red" sector of Omaha Beach.

The image was one of the most widely reproduced photographs of the D-Day landings. The original photograph is stored by the United States Coast Guard Historian's Office.

Background
Neptune was the largest combat operation ever performed by the United States Coast Guard.

Waves continuously broke over the boat's square bow, and the soldiers inside were drenched in cold ocean water.

In all, Samuel Chase lost six landing craft on D-Day; four foundered near the beach, one was "impaled" by a beach obstacle, and another was sunk by enemy gunfire.

Origin of the phrase 
The phrase "into the jaws of Death" in the photograph's title comes from a refrain in "The Charge of the Light Brigade", an 1854 narrative poem by Alfred, Lord Tennyson about the Charge of the Light Brigade at the Battle of Balaclava during the Crimean War.

In popular culture 
The image was evoked in the 1998 Hollywood film Saving Private Ryan, and appears on the cover of Stanley Lombardo's 1997 English translation of the Iliad as a symbol of the universality of war.

See also
 List of photographs considered the most important

References

External links 

Operation Overlord
Black-and-white photographs
Non-fiction works about the United States Army
World War II photographs
Works about the United States Coast Guard
1944 photographs
1940s photographs